Eaton HK (), owned by the Great Eagle Group, is a four-star hotel located at 380 Nathan Road in Kowloon, between Jordan and Yau Ma Tei, near the Temple Street Night Market and the Jade Market.

History
The Eaton Hotel occupies the location of the former Astor Theatre / Po Hing Theatre, Kowloon's first cinema. The tower hotel was built in the 1970s.

In the fall of 2018, Eaton Hong Kong was rebranded as Eaton HK, a hotel under Eaton Workshop. The hotel's design was overhauled by the US company AvroKO.

Description
Eaton HK has 465 rooms in a range of sizes and configurations, ranging from 172 sq. ft. to 603 sq. ft. Eaton HK has three ballrooms/function rooms ranging from 690sq.ft. to 2570sq.ft. Eaton HK has the following restaurants: Yat Tung Heen, The Astor, Terrible Baby, and the Eaton Food Hall. The hotel also includes an art gallery, “Tomorrow Maybe”.

Eaton Workshop is part of the portfolio of Hong Kong based Great Eagle Holdings Ltd, which is also the parent company of Langham Hospitality Group, both helmed by Chairman, Ka Shui Lo, billionaire son of the late real estate tycoon Lo Ying-shek. The hotel is owned by Katherine Lo who acquired the building from her father.

Transportation 
The hotel is a five-minute walk from Jordan station. Many buses also ply Nathan Road.

References

External links

Hotels in Hong Kong
Yau Ma Tei